Mycosphaerella eumusae is a fungal disease of banana (Musa spp.), causing Eumusae leaf spot. Its symptoms are similar to black leaf streak (Black Sigatoka). M. eumusae is the predominant Mycospharella of banana in mainland Malaysia and in Thailand, and is present in Mauritius and Nigeria. Septoria eumusae is an anamorph of Mycosphaerella eumusae.

References

See also
 List of Mycosphaerella species

eumusae
Fungal plant pathogens and diseases
Fungi described in 2000